Gladstone–Mount Larcom Road is a continuous  road route in the Gladstone region of Queensland, Australia. The route is signed as State Route 58. Gladstone–Mount Larcom Road (number 181) is a state-controlled regional road.

Route Description
It runs north-west, becoming Hanson Road, turning west and then south-west before crossing Auckland Creek into . After crossing a branch of Auckland Creek it runs north-west, passing the Gladstone Power Station and crossing the Calliope River and its anabranch, before entering .

The road continues north-west as Hanson Road until it comes to an intersection with Landing Road, where it changes to Gladstone–Mount Larcom Road. This soon turns south-west and crosses the railway line as it enters . It follows the railway line to the west through Aldoga and then parallels it north-west along the south-western boundary before meeting the Bruce Highway in Mount Larcom.  lies just north of the road, and  lies to the south. Land uses along this road include residential, industrial and rural, including some areas of native vegetation.

State Route 58
State Route 58 follows a number of separately named roads from Benaraby to Gladstone, and from Gladstone to Mount Larcom. It is a slightly longer alternative to the Bruce Highway. It leaves the Bruce Highway at Benaraby and follows the Gladstone–Benaraby Road north. In South Gladstone it turns west on Philip Street and then north on Glenlyon Road, which soon becomes Glenlyon Street. It passes the north-eastern end of the Dawson Highway in Gladstone Central and then turns west as Hanson Road. This runs generally west until it reaches Yarwun, where it changes to Gladstone–Mount Larcom Road, which continues south-west, west, and north-west until it reaches the Bruce Highway at Mount Larcom.

Road condition
Gladstone–Mount Larcom Road is fully sealed.

History

The area where Gladstone now stands was the site of a short-lived convict settlement in 1847. In 1853 a new town was surveyed, and the next year a government agent was appointed, resulting in an influx of free settlers as land became available throughout the region. The first school opened in 1861, and the town became a Municipality in 1863. Development was slow until 1893 when a meatworks was established. The railway line arrived in 1897.

In January 1854, the New South Wales government proclaimed two new districts: Port Curtis (based on Gladstone) and Leichhardt (later renamed Fitzroy, based on Rockhampton). This released vast amounts of good grazing land for selection. Pastoral runs were soon taken up in these areas, leading to the cutting of tracks suitable for wheeled vehicles from the commercial centres to the properties. One such track was the forerunner of the Dawson Highway, while others formed the basis of what eventually became the Bruce Highway. Until the forerunner of the Gladstone–Mount Larcom Road was built, with its four bridges, the shortest route from Gladstone to Mount Larcom was via , about  further than the current route.

Mount Larcom pastoral run was established as a sheep station in 1855, and the Targinia run, in Targinnie to the east, opened in 1863 and became a fruit farm, later adding sheep to its products. After several years of armed conflict with Aboriginal people, closer settlement began in the Mount Larcom district, with the first school opening in 1882. The railway line from Gladstone to Rockhampton opened in 1903, and schools were opened in Targinnie and Yarwun in 1902 and 1906 respectively.

Both before and after the arrival of the railway there was a growing demand for a more direct and more reliable road connection to Gladstone. This was eventually achieved with the opening of the initial version of the Gladstone–Mount Larcom Road.

Major intersections
All distances are from Google Maps. The entire road is in the Gladstone local government area.

See also

 List of road routes in Queensland
 List of numbered roads in Queensland

References

Roads in Queensland